Robert Campbell Dunn (February 14, 1855 – October 29, 1918) was an American politician and businessman.

Born in Plumbridge, County Tyrone, Ireland, Dunn emigrated to the United States in 1870 and settled in Princeton, Minnesota in 1876. Dunn was the editor and publisher of The Princeton Union newspaper. He served as town clerk for Princeton, Minnesota from 1878 to 1889 and as county attorney for Mille Lacs County, Minnesota from 1884 to 1886. Dunn was  a Republican. In 1889 and 1890, 1893 and 1894 and from 1911 to 1914, Dunn served in the Minnesota House of Representatives. Then, Dunn served as Minnesota State Auditor from 1895 to 1903. Then, Dunn served in the Minnesota State Senate from 1915 until his death on October 28, 1918. Dunn died at his home in Princeton, Minnesota. His grandson Robert G. Dunn also served in the Minnesota Legislature.

References

  	

1855 births
1918 deaths
Irish emigrants to the United States (before 1923)
People from County Tyrone
People from Princeton, Minnesota
Editors of Minnesota newspapers
State Auditors of Minnesota
Republican Party members of the Minnesota House of Representatives
Republican Party Minnesota state senators